This is a list of notable alumni of Harvard Law School.

Law and politics

United States government

Executive branch

U.S. Presidents

Rutherford B. Hayes, 19th President of the United States
Barack Obama, 44th President of the United States

U.S. Attorneys General
Francis Biddle
Charles Joseph Bonaparte, also United States Secretary of the Navy and founder of the precursor to the FBI
William M. Evarts, also Secretary of State and a Senator from New York
Merrick Garland, also former Chief Judge, United States Court of Appeals for the District of Columbia Circuit
Alberto Gonzales
Ebenezer R. Hoar
Loretta Lynch
Richard Kleindienst
Richard Olney, later also Secretary of State
Janet Reno
Elliot Richardson
William French Smith

Other cabinet and cabinet-level officials
Spencer Abraham, Secretary of Energy, Senator from Michigan
Elliott Abrams, Deputy National Security Advisor
Dean Acheson, Secretary of State; instrumental in the creation of Lend-Lease, the Marshall Plan, NATO, the International Monetary Fund and the World Bank, together with the precursors of the European Union and the World Trade Organization, and influential in the decision to enter the Korean War
Alexander Acosta, Secretary of Labor
Brock Adams, Secretary of Transportation, Senator and Representative from Washington
Charles Francis Adams III, Secretary of the Navy
Bruce Babbitt, Secretary of the Interior, Governor of Arizona
William Bennett, Secretary of Education, "Drug Czar," and conservative political pundit
Sandy Berger, National Security Advisor
Charles Joseph Bonaparte, Secretary of the Navy, United States Attorney General, founded the precursor to the Federal Bureau of Investigation
Joseph Califano, Secretary of Health, Education, and Welfare
John Chafee, Secretary of the Navy, Governor of Rhode Island, Senator from Rhode Island
Michael Chertoff, Secretary of Homeland Security
William Thaddeus Coleman, Jr., Secretary of Transportation
John Thomas Connor, Secretary of Commerce
Elizabeth Dole, Secretary of Labor, Secretary of Transportation, Senator from North Carolina
 James H. Freis, Jr., global fraud expert and former Director of the Financial Crimes Enforcement Network (FinCEN)
Robert Todd Lincoln, Secretary of War, Ambassador to the United Kingdom
Ray Mabus, Secretary of the Navy
Ogden L. Mills, United States Secretary of the Treasury
Mike Pompeo, Secretary of State (2018-2021), Director of the Central Intelligence Agency (2017–2018)
Samantha Power, U.S. Permanent Representative to the United Nations
William Ruckelshaus, Administrator of the Environmental Protection Agency (1970–73; 1983–85)
Henry L. Stimson, Secretary of State, Secretary of War, Governor General of the Philippines
Caspar Weinberger, Secretary of Defense (1981–1987)
Willard Wirtz, Secretary of Labor (1962–1969)
Robert Zoellick, Deputy Secretary of State, United States Trade Representative, President of the World Bank
Ron Klain, White House Chief of Staff (2021-); Chief of Staff to Vice President Joe Biden, (2008–11)

Legislative branch (U.S. Congress)

Senators
Spencer Abraham, Senator from Michigan (1995–2001), United States Secretary of Energy(2001–05) 
Brock Adams, Senator (1987–1993) and Representative (1965–1977) from Washington, United States Secretary of Transportation, (1977–79) 
Ralph Owen Brewster, Senator from Maine (1941–1952), Governor of Maine(1925–1929) 
John Chafee, Senator from Rhode Island (1976–1999), Governor of Rhode Island (1963–69), Secretary of the Navy (1969–72) 
Tom Cotton, Arkansas Senator, (2015–present) and Representative (2013–2015)
Mike Crapo, Senator (1999–present) and Representative (1993–1999) from Idaho 
Ted Cruz, Senator (2013–present) from Texas
Elizabeth Dole, Senator from North Carolina (2003–2009), Secretary of Labor (1989–1990), Secretary of Transportation (1983–1987) 
Thomas Eagleton, Senator from Missouri (1968–1987), Democratic Vice-Presidential nominee (1972) 
Sam Ervin, Senator from North Carolina (1954–1974) 
Russ Feingold, Senator from Wisconsin (1993–2011) 
George G. Fogg, Senator from New Hampshire (1866–1867) 
Hiram Leong Fong, Senator from Hawaii (1959–1977) 
David H. Gambrell, Senator from Georgia (1971–1972) 
Frederick H. Gillett, U.S. Senator (1925–1931) and U.S. Representative (1893–1925) from Massachusetts, Speaker of the House (1919–1925) 
Bob Graham, Senator from Florida (1987–2005), Governor of Florida (1979–87) 
George Frisbie Hoar, Senator from Massachusetts (1877–1904) 
Jim Jeffords, Senator from Vermont (1989–2007) 
Tim Kaine, Senator from Virginia  (2013–present) Governor of Virginia (2006–2010), Democratic Vice-Presidential nominee (2016).
Kenneth Keating, Senator (1959–1965) and Representative (1953–1959) from New York 
Carl Levin, Senator from Michigan (1979–2015) 
Henry Cabot Lodge, Senator (1893–1924) and Representative (1887–1893) from Massachusetts 
Spark Matsunaga, Senator (1977–1990) and Representative (1971–1977) from Hawaii 
Claude Pepper, Senator (1936–1951) and Representative (1963–1989) from Florida 
Larry Pressler, Senator from South Dakota (1979–1997) 
Jack Reed, Senator from Rhode Island (1997–present) 
Mitt Romney, Senator from Utah (2019–present) Governor of Massachusetts (2003-2007)
William Roth, Senator (1971–2001) and Representative (1967–1970) from Delaware 
Leverett Saltonstall, Senator from Massachusetts (1945–1967), Governor of Massachusetts (1939–45) 
Paul Sarbanes, Senator (1977–2007) and Representative (1971–1977) from Maryland 
Charles Schumer, Senator (1999–present) and Representative (1981–99) from New York 
Ted Stevens, Senator from Alaska (1968–2009) 
Adlai Stevenson III, Senator from Illinois (1970–1981) 
Charles Sumner, Senator from Massachusetts (1851–1874) 
Robert A. Taft, Senator from Ohio, (1939–1953)
Robert Taft Jr., (L.L.B. 1942) Senator (1971–1976) and Representative (1967–71) from Ohio
Mark Warner, U.S. Senator from Virginia (2009–present), and Governor of Virginia, (2002–2006)

Representatives
 Richard S. Aldrich, Rhode Island (1923–33)
Tom Allen, Maine (1997–2009) 
John Anderson, Illinois (1961–1981) and independent candidate in the 1980 Presidential election 
John Barrow, Georgia (2005–2015)
Anthony Brown, Maryland (2017–present) and Lieutenant Governor of Maryland (2009–2016)  
Anson Burlingame, Massachusetts (1855–1861) 
Tom Campbell, California (1989–1993, 1995–2001) and dean of the Haas School of Business 
Joaquin Castro, Texas (2013–present)
Patrick A. Collins, Massachusetts (1883–1889), Mayor of Boston, Massachusetts  (1902–1905) 
Jim Cooper, Tennessee (1983–present) 
Christopher Cox, California (1989–2005), Chairman of the Securities and Exchange Commission (2005–2009) 
William C. Cramer, Florida (1955–1971)
Artur Davis, Alabama (2003–2011) 
William Thomas Ellis, Kentucky (1889–1895) 
George Eustis, Louisiana (1855–1859) 
Daniel J. Flood, Pennsylvania (1945–1947, 1949–1953, 1955–1980) 
Barney Frank, Massachusetts (1981–2012) 
Alan Grayson, Florida (2009–2017)
Josh Gottheimer, New Jersey (2017–present)
Jane Harman, California(1993–1999; 2001–2011)
Bill Jefferson, Louisiana (1991–2009) 
Joseph P. Kennedy III, Massachusetts (2013–2021)
Sander Levin, Michigan (1983–2019) 
Walter I. McCoy, New Jersey (1911–1914)
Tom Petri, Wisconsin (1979–2015) 
John Sarbanes, Maryland (2007–present) 
Adam Schiff, California (2001–present) 
Pat Schroeder, Colorado (1973–1997) (first woman elected to position) 
Terri Sewell, Alabama (2011–present) 
Brad Sherman, California (1997–present) 
William H. Sowden, Pennsylvania (1885–1889) 
Juan Vargas, California (2013–present)
Laurence Hawley Watres, Pennsylvania (1923–1931)

Judicial branch

Supreme Court justices

Harry Blackmun
Louis Brandeis
William Brennan
Stephen Breyer
Harold Hitz Burton
Benjamin Curtis
Felix Frankfurter
Horace Gray
Oliver Wendell Holmes Jr.
Ketanji Brown Jackson (sitting)
Elena Kagan (sitting)
Anthony Kennedy
Lewis Powell
John Roberts (Chief Justice, sitting)
Edward T. Sanford
Antonin Scalia 
David Souter
Neil Gorsuch (sitting)

Federal Court judges

R. Lanier Anderson III, Circuit Judge, United States Court of Appeals for the Eleventh Circuit 
Christine Arguello, (1980) District Judge, United States District Court for the District of Colorado 
Morris S. Arnold, Senior Circuit Judge, Eighth Circuit Court of Appeals based in Little Rock 
Richard S. Arnold, Circuit Judge, Eighth Circuit Court of Appeals, federal courthouse in Little Rock bears his name
David J. Barron (J.D. 1994), Circuit Judge, United States Court of Appeals for the First Circuit
John R. Bartels, United States District Court for the Eastern District of New York 
Deborah Batts, former District Judge, United States District Court for the Southern District of New York 
Cathy Bissoon, (J.D. 1993) District Judge, United States District Court for the Western District of Pennsylvania
Victor Allen Bolden (J.D. 1989), District Judge, United States District Court for the District of Connecticut
Michael Boudin, (LL.B. 1964) Senior Judge, United States Court of Appeals for the First Circuit
Andrew L. Brasher (J.D. 2006), Circuit Judge, United States Court of Appeals for the Eleventh Circuit
Vernon S. Broderick (J.D. 1988), District Judge, United States District Court for the Southern District of New York
Patrick J. Bumatay (J.D. 2006), Circuit Judge, United States Court of Appeals for the Ninth Circuit
John K. Bush (J.D. 1989), Circuit Judge, United States Court of Appeals for the Sixth Circuit
Edward Earl Carnes (J.D. 1975) Circuit Judge, United States Court of Appeals for the Eleventh Circuit 
Susan L. Carney, (J.D. 1977), Circuit Judge, United States Court of Appeals for the Second Circuit
Andrew L. Carter Jr. (J.D. 1994), District Judge, United States District Court for the Southern District of New York
Denise J. Casper (J.D. 1994), District Judge, United States District Court for the District of Massachusetts
Herbert Young Cho Choy (J.D. 1941), Circuit Judge, United States Court of Appeals for the Ninth Circuit 
Theodore D. Chuang (J.D. 1994), District Judge, United States District Court for the District of Maryland
Geoffrey W. Crawford (J.D. 1980), Chief Judge, United States District Court for the District of Vermont
Tiffany P. Cunningham (J.D. 2001), Circuit Judge, United States Court of Appeals for the Federal Circuit
Paul A. Engelmayer (J.D. 1987), District Judge, United States District Court for the Southern District of New York
Katherine Polk Failla (J.D. 1993), District Judge, United States District Court for the Southern District of New York
Beth Labson Freeman (J.D. 1979), District Judge, United States District Court for the Northern District of California
Henry Friendly, (LL.B. 1927), Circuit Judge, United States Court of Appeals for the Second Circuit, 1959–1974; senior circuit judge, 1974–1976 
John P. Fullam, (LL.B. 1948), former District Judge, United States District Court for the Eastern District of Pennsylvania 
Marvin J. Garbis (J.D. 1961), District Judge, United States District Court for the District of Maryland
 James Knoll Gardner (J.D. 1965), District Judge, United States District Court for the Eastern District of Pennsylvania 
Mark A. Goldsmith (J.D. 1977), District Judge, United States District Court for the Eastern District of Michigan
Andrew Patrick Gordon (J.D. 1987), District Judge, United States District Court for the District of Nevada
Myron L. Gordon, late District Judge, United States District Court for the Eastern District of Wisconsin 
Joseph A. Greenaway, (J.D. 1981), Circuit Judge, United States Court of Appeals for the Third Circuit
Learned Hand, (LL.B. 1896) Circuit Judge, United States Court of Appeals for the Second Circuit 
George C. Hanks Jr. (J.D. 1989), District Judge, United States District Court for the Southern District of Texas
Harris Hartz, (J.D. 1972), Circuit Judge, United States Court of Appeals for the Tenth Circuit
Amy Berman Jackson (J.D. 1979), District Judge, United States District Court for the District of Columbia
R. Brooke Jackson (J.D. 1972), District Judge, United States District Court for the District of Colorado
Michael J. Juneau (J.D. 1987), District Judge, United States District Court for the Western District of Louisiana
Gregory G. Katsas (J.D. 1989), Circuit Judge, United States Court of Appeals for the District of Columbia Circuit
William J. Kayatta Jr. (J.D. 1979), Circuit Judge, United States Court of Appeals for the First Circuit 
Jane L. Kelly (J.D. 1991), Circuit Judge, United States Court of Appeals for the Eighth Circuit 
Matthew Kennelly, (J.D. 1981), District Judge, United States District Court for the Northern District of Illinois 
Whitman Knapp, (LL.B. 1934, District Judge, United States District Court for the Southern District of New York. Investigated corruption in the NYPD
Jonathan A. Kobes (J.D. 2000), Circuit Judge, United States Court of Appeals for the Eighth Circuit
Lucy Koh (J.D. 1993), District Judge, United States District Court for the Northern District of California
William Francis Kuntz (J.D. 1979), District Judge, United States District Court for the Eastern District of New York
Dominic W. Lanza (J.D. 2002), District Judge, United States District Court for the District of Arizona
John Z. Lee (J.D. 1992), District Judge, United States District Court for the Northern District of Illinois
Kenneth K. Lee (J.D. 2000), Circuit Judge, United States Court of Appeals for the Ninth Circuit
Matthew Frederick Leitman (J.D. 1993), District Judge, United States District Court for the Eastern District of Michigan
Pierre Leval (J.D. 1963) Senior Judge, United States Court of Appeals for the Second Circuit
Gregory E. Maggs (J.D. 1988), Judge, United States Court of Appeals for the Armed Forces
D. Price Marshall Jr. (J.D. 1989), Chief Judge, United States District Court for the Eastern District of Arkansas
Patricia Millett (J.D. 1988), Circuit Judge, United States Court of Appeals for the District of Columbia Circuit 
Kevin Newsom (J.D. 1997), Circuit Judge, United States Court of Appeals for the Eleventh Circuit
John T. Noonan, Jr. (LL.B. 1954), Senior Judge, United States Court of Appeals for the Ninth Circuit 
Diarmuid O'Scannlain (J.D. 1963), Senior Judge, United States Court of Appeals for the Ninth Circuit
Andy Oldham (J.D. 2005), Circuit Judge, United States Court of Appeals for the Fifth Circuit
Cornelia Pillard (J.D. 1987), Circuit Judge, United States Court of Appeals for the District of Columbia Circuit 
Richard A. Posner (LL.B. 1962), Circuit Judge, United States Court of Appeals for the Seventh Circuit 
Jed S. Rakoff (J.D. 1969), Senior Judge, United States District Court for the Southern District of New York
Edgardo Ramos (J.D. 1987), District Judge, United States District Court for the Southern District of New York
Thomas Morrow Reavley (J.D.1948), Senior Circuit Judge, United States Court of Appeals for the Fifth Circuit 
Lee Rudofsky (J.D. 2005), District Judge, United States District Court for the Eastern District of Arkansas
Bruce Marshall Selya (LL.B. 1958), Senior Judge, United States Court of Appeals for the First Circuit 
Laurence Silberman (J.D. 1961), Senior Judge, United States Court of Appeals for the District of Columbia Circuit 
Michael H. Simon (J.D. 1981), District Judge, United States District Court for the District of Oregon
James R. Spencer (J.D 1974), Senior Judge, United States District Court for the Eastern District of Virginia
Josephine Staton (J.D. 1986), District Judge, United States District Court for the Central District of California
A. Wallace Tashima (LL.B. 1961), third Asian American to be appointed to the United States Court of Appeals
Amy Totenberg (J.D. 1977), District Judge, United States District Court for the Northern District of Georgia
Lawrence VanDyke (J.D. 2005), Circuit Judge, United States Court of Appeals for the Ninth Circuit
Lawrence J. Vilardo (J.D. 1980), District Judge, United States District Court for the Western District of New York
Justin R. Walker (J.D. 2009), District Judge, United States District Court for the Western District of Kentucky
Derrick Watson (J.D. 1991), District Judge, United States District Court for the District of Hawaii
Robert L. Wilkins (J.D. 1989), Circuit Judge, United States Court of Appeals for the District of Columbia Circuit 
Mark L. Wolf (J.D. 1971), Senior Judge, United States District Court for the District of Massachusetts 
Joshua Wolson (J.D. 1999), District Judge, United States District Court for the Eastern District of Pennsylvania
Kimba Wood (J.D. 1969), Senior Judge, United States District Court for the Southern District of New York
Wilhelmina Wright (J.D. 1989), District Judge, United States District Court for the District of Minnesota

State government

Governors
Ron DeSantis, Governor of Florida, Former Member of the United States House of Representatives(JD,2005)
Bruce Babbitt, Governor of Arizona, United States Secretary of the Interior
Percival Proctor Baxter (1901), Governor of Maine (1921–1925)
Owen Brewster, Governor of Maine, Senator from Maine 
John Chafee, Governor of Rhode Island, Senator from Rhode Island, Secretary of the Navy 
Jim Doyle, Governor of Wisconsin
Michael Dukakis, Governor of Massachusetts; Democratic presidential nominee (1988)
Pierre S. du Pont, IV, Governor of Delaware; US Representative from Delaware 
Joseph B. Ely, Governor of Massachusetts (1931–1935)
Bob Graham, Governor of Florida, Senator from Florida 
Jennifer Granholm, Governor of Michigan
Deval Patrick, Governor of Massachusetts 
Sylvester Pennoyer, Governor of Oregon 
 Robert E. Quinn, Governor of Rhode Island and Judge for the Rhode Island Superior Court
Leverett Saltonstall, Governor of Massachusetts, Senator from Massachusetts 
Eliot Spitzer, Governor of New York 
Bruce Sundlun, Governor of Rhode Island
Aníbal Acevedo Vilá, Governor of the Commonwealth of Puerto Rico 
William Weld, Governor of Massachusetts

State politicians
Michael G. Adams, Secretary of State of Kentucky
John O. Bailey, State Senator and Representative in Oregon, Chief Justice of the Oregon Supreme Court
F. Elliott Barber, Jr., Vermont Attorney General
Brent Barton, State Representative of Oregon
Mike Beltran, Florida State Representative; litigator
Daniel Bigelow, served in first legislature of Washington Territory, 1854
Wendy Davis, Texas State Senator and 2014 Democratic Gubernatorial nominee
Jesse Gabriel, State Assemblyman of California
Raj Goyle, State Representative of Kansas
 Craig Greenberg (born 1973), businessman, lawyer, and politician; Mayor-elect of Louisville
Harold Groves, State Senator and Assemblyman of Wisconsin
 George Howe, State's Attorney of Windham County, United States Attorney for the District of Vermont, member of the Vermont Senate
Brad Hoylman, State Senator of New York
Sheila Kuehl, first openly gay member of the California legislature; child actress
Patrick D. McGee (1916–70), California State Assembly and Los Angeles City Council member in the mid–20th Century
Jonathan Miller, State Treasurer of Kentucky, democratic candidate for Governor of Kentucky, 2007
James M. Ogden, Indiana Attorney General
Steve Pajcic, State Representative of Florida, democratic candidate for Governor of Florida, 1986
Alvin C. Reis, State Senator and Assemblyman of Wisconsin
Lycurgus J. Rusk, State Assemblyman of Wisconsin
Eric T. Schneiderman, New York Attorney General
Ilana Rubel, State Representative of Idaho
Scott Wiener, State Senator of California

State judges
John F. Aiso (LL.B. 1934), Associate Justice of the California Court of Appeal. First Japanese American Judge in the US.
John O. Bailey, Chief Justice of the Oregon Supreme Court, state Senator and Representative in Oregon
Norman L. Bassett, Associate Justice of the Maine Supreme Court
Samuel H. Blackmer (LL.B., 1927), Associate Justice of the Vermont Supreme Court
Andre G. Bouchard, former Managing Partner Bouchard, Margules, & Friedlander, Chancellor of the Delaware Court of Chancery
Amos Noyes Blandin Jr. (LL.B., 1921), Justice of the New Hampshire Supreme Court
James T. Brand, Chief Justice of the Oregon Supreme Court
Bruce Bromley, Associate Judge of the New York Court of Appeals, partner at Cravath, Swaine & Moore
Raoul G. Cantero III, Associate Justice of the Florida Supreme Court
Chester C. Cole, Chief Justice of the Iowa Supreme Court, founder of the University of Iowa College of Law, founder of Drake University Law School
Federico Hernández Denton, Chief Justice of the Puerto Rico Supreme Court
James Emmert (1923), Justice of the Indiana Supreme Court and Indiana Attorney General.
Jennifer Walker Elrod (J.D. 1992), Texas state district judge
Patrick F. Fischer, Justice of the Supreme Court of Ohio
Paul C. Gartzke, Presiding Judge of the Wisconsin Court of Appeals
W. Michael Gillette, Oregon Supreme Court justice
Ernest W. Gibson III (LL.B. 1956), Associate Justice of the Vermont Supreme Court
Benjamin N. Hulburd (LL.B. 1928), Chief Justice of the Vermont Supreme Court
Masaji Marumoto (1906-1995), Associate Justice of the Hawaii Supreme Court
 Sherman R. Moulton, Chief Justice of the Vermont Supreme Court
Mary Mullarkey, Chief Justice of the Colorado Supreme Court
John S. Murdock (1899), Justice of the Rhode Island Supreme Court from 1929 to 1935.
Stuart Rabner, Chief Justice of the New Jersey Supreme Court
Gerald Schroeder, Chief Justice of the Idaho Supreme Court
Nathaniel Tompkins, Associate Justice of the Maine Supreme Judicial Court

City government
Isaac Adler, Mayor of Rochester, New York
David Chiu (J.D.), City Attorney of San Francisco
Robert A. Dressler (J.D. 1973), Mayor of Fort Lauderdale, Florida (1982–1986)
Jorge Elorza (J.D.), Mayor of Providence, Rhode Island (2015–present)
Karen Freeman-Wilson, Mayor of Gary, Indiana (2012–2019)
Sam Liccardo (J.D. 1996), Mayor of the City of San Jose, California (2015–present)
James Marshall Head, Mayor of Nashville, Tennessee (1900–1904)
Randal William McGavock, Mayor of Nashville, Tennessee (1858–1859) and Confederate Lt. Col.
Neville Miller (LL.B. 1920), Mayor of Louisville, Kentucky (1933–1937)
Adrian Perkins, Mayor of Shreveport, Louisiana (2018–present)
Joel Wachs, Los Angeles City Council member (1970–2001), president of the Andy Warhol Foundation for the Visual Arts
Anthony A. Williams (J.D.), Mayor of Washington, D.C. (1999–2007)

U.S. diplomatic figures
Norman Armour, career diplomat, chief of mission in eight countries, Assistant Secretary of State
Richard L. Baltimore, United States Ambassador to Oman (2002–2006)
Joseph Hodges Choate, United States Ambassador to the United Kingdom (1848–1852)
Norman L. Eisen (J.D. 1991), United States Ambassador to the Czech Republic
Nicholas Fish II, held various diplomatic posts across Europe
Charles W. Freeman Jr., United States Ambassador to Saudi Arabia (1989–1992)
Evan G. Galbraith, United States Ambassador to France (1981–1985)
Rita Hauser, United States Ambassador to the United Nations Commission on Human Rights (1969–1972)
Philip Lader, United States Ambassador to the United Kingdom, White House Deputy Chief of Staff, Administrator of the Small Business Administration
Robert Todd Lincoln, United States Ambassador to the United Kingdom, United States Secretary of War
Jamie Metzl (J.D.), holder of various diplomatic and human rights positions
Crystal Nix-Hines, attorney; television writer and producer; U.S. Permanent Representative to the United Nations
William Phillips, twice an Undersecretary in the State Department
Samantha Power, U.S. Ambassador to the United Nations
Andrew H. Schapiro, former United States Ambassador to the Czech Republic; partner of Quinn Emanuel Urquhart & Sullivan 
Todd Stern, Special Envoy for Climate Change
Sheldon Vance, United States Ambassador to the Democratic Republic of the Congo and Chad
Robert Zoellick, Deputy Secretary of State, US Trade Representative, President of the World Bank

Other U.S. political figures
Paul V. Applegarth, first CEO of the Millennium Challenge Corporation
John B. Bellinger III, Legal Adviser of the Department of State
Richard C. Breeden, Chairman of the Securities and Exchange Commission
Charles Burson, chief of staff to Vice President Al Gore and Tennessee Attorney General
Pedro Albizu Campos, leader of the Puerto Rico independence movement and the Puerto Rican Nationalist Party
Calvin G. Child (1858), United States Attorney for the District of Connecticut, and a city judge in Norwich, Connecticut
Lawrence Clayton (LL.B. 1916), Federal Reserve Board of Governors (1934–1949)
Paul Clement, Solicitor General of the United States
Archibald Cox, Solicitor General of the United States and special prosecutor during the Watergate scandal
Raj Date, Special Advisor for the Consumer Financial Protection Bureau (2011–2012)
A. J. Delgado, senior advisor to the 2016 Donald Trump presidential campaign and member of the Trump transition team
Viet D. Dinh, Assistant Attorney General of the United States
Glenn A. Fine (J.D. 1985), Inspector General of the Justice Department (2000–present)
Patrick Fitzgerald, U.S. Attorney for the Northern District of Illinois, prosecutor of many notable corruption trials
David Frum, author and speechwriter for President George W. Bush
Ray Garrett Jr., Chairman of the Securities and Exchange Commission
Julius Genachowski, Chairman of the Federal Communications Commission
David Gergen, political consultant and presidential advisor
David Ginsburg, presidential adviser and executive director of the Kerner Commission
Josh Gottheimer, speechwriter for Bill Clinton, strategist, candidate for the United States House of Representatives
Erwin Griswold, Solicitor General of the United States and Dean of Harvard Law School
Conrad K. Harper, Legal Adviser of the Department of State and president of the New York City Bar Association
Denison Kitchel (LL.B. 1933), national campaign manager for Barry M. Goldwater in 1964
Jerome Kurtz (1955), Commissioner of the Internal Revenue Service (1977–1980) 
Michael Leiter, Director of the National Counterterrorism Center
David Lilienthal, head of the Tennessee Valley Authority
Karen L. Loeffler, United States Attorney for the District of Alaska
Ronald Machen, United States Attorney for the District of Columbia
Kent Markus, advisor to Ohio Gov. Ted Strickland and former nominee to the U.S. Court of Appeals for the Sixth Circuit
Kevin J. Martin, Chairman of the Federal Communications Commission
Fernando Martín García, Puerto Rican politician and former member of the Senate of Puerto Rico
Timothy Massad, Chairman of the Commodity Futures Trading Commission
John J. McCloy, assistant Secretary of War, administered US occupation of Germany, president of the World Bank
Wade H. McCree, Solicitor General of the United States
Joseph A. McNamara, U.S. Attorney for Vermont
Ken Mehlman, chairman of the Republican National Committee; campaign manager for George W. Bush's second presidential run
Ralph Nader, Green Party presidential candidate (1996, 2000, 2004); consumer advocate
Michelle Obama, First Lady of the United States
Matthew G. Olsen, Director of the National Counterterrorism Center
David Peyman, Deputy Assistant Secretary of State for Counter Threat Finance and Sanctions (2018– )
Loulan Pitre, Jr., New Orleans lawyer and former member of the Louisiana House of Representatives for Lafourche Parish, Louisiana
Franklin Raines, Director of the United States Office of Management and Budget
Edith Ramirez, Chairwoman of the Federal Trade Commission
Joseph Sandler, longest serving General Counsel of the Democratic National Committee (1993–2009)
Bob Shrum, political consultant
William Howard Taft IV, Legal Adviser of the Department of State
Elisse B. Walter, Chairperson of the Securities and Exchange Commission
Harold M. Williams, Chairman of the Securities and Exchange Commission and first president of the J. Paul Getty Trust
Lee S. Wolosky, former White House counterterrorism official
Juan Zarate, Deputy National Security Advisor

Non-United States government

Non-United States political figures

Canada
Michael Bryant, (LL.M., magna cum laude, 1994) Attorney General of Ontario
Loring Christie, Envoy Extraordinary and Minister Plenipotentiary to the United States (1939–1941)
Francis Fox, Canadian cabinet minister and Principal Secretary
Joseph Ghiz, Premier of Prince Edward Island, Canada
Robert Stanfield, Premier of Nova Scotia, Canada
Nigel S. Wright, Chief of Staff of the Office of the Prime Minister

India
Shankar Dayal Sharma, former President of India
Kapil Sibal (LLM, 1977), held various ministerial posts (2004–2014), Member of Parliament (Rajya Sabha for Uttar Pradesh 2016–present); former Additional Solicitor General of India (1989–1990); three-time President of the Supreme Court Bar Association (1995–96, 1997–98 and 2001–2002)

Taiwan (Republic of China)
Annette Lu (LL.M.), former Vice President of the Republic of China
Ma Ying-jeou (S.J.D.), President of the Republic of China, Chairman of the Kuomintang, former Mayor of Taipei

United Kingdom
Greville Janner, Baron Janner of Braunstone, British Labour Party politician
David Lammy (LLM), UK Minister of State for Higher Education, former Minister of Culture, MP for Tottenham
Anthony Lester, Baron Lester of Herne Hill, Liberal Democrat member of the British House of Lords

Other countries
Ben Bot, former Minister of Foreign Affairs of the Netherlands
Juan Ponce Enrile (LL.M.), Senator at the Senate of the Philippines
Daniel Friedmann, Israeli Minister of Justice
José García-Margallo, former Minister of Foreign Affairs and Cooperation of Spain
Lindsay Grant, former Leader of the People's Action Movement of Saint Kitts and Nevis
Ho Peng Kee (LL.M. 1981), former Member of Parliament and Senior Minister of State in the Ministry of Law and the Ministry of Home Affairs in Singapore
Daniel Lipšic, Interior Minister of Slovakia, former Minister of Justice
Fientje Moerman, Belgian, and later Flemish, Minister of Economy, Enterprises, Innovation, Science and Foreign Trade
Khalid Jawed Khan, Attorney General of Pakistan
Kiraitu Murungi, Kenyan Minister of Justice and Constitutional Affairs and Energy
Luis María Ramírez Boettner, former Minister of Foreign Affairs of Paraguay
Mary Robinson, former President of the Republic of Ireland and UN High Commissioner for Human Rights
Nawaf Salam, Lebanon's Permanent Representative to the United Nations
Jovito Salonga (LL.M.), Philippine senator
 Lobsang Sangay, Sikyong Tibetan Government in Exile
Surakiart Sathirathai, Deputy Prime Minister of Thailand
Gilbert Teodoro (LL.M.), Secretary of the Department of National Defense of the Philippines and former Congressman
Ahmed Zaki Yamani, Saudi Arabian Oil Minister and OPEC official
Sonny Angara (LL.M.), Senator at the Senate of the Philippines
Roberto Dañino (LL.M.), Prime Minister of Peru (2001-2002) and Ambassador of Peru to the United States (2002-2003)

Non-United States judicial figures

International court judges
Georges Abi-Saab, Egyptian jurist who served on the Appeals Chamber of the International Criminal Tribunal for Yugoslavia and International Criminal Tribunal for Rwanda, as Chairman of the Appellate Body of the World Trade Organization, and as judge ad hoc at the International Court of Justice
Richard Reeve Baxter, United States judge appointed to the International Court of Justice
Thomas Buergenthal, United States judge appointed to the International Court of Justice and the Inter-American Court of Human Rights
Charles N. Brower, United States judge appointed to the Iran-US Claims Tribunal
O-Gon Kwon, South Korean judge who served as Vice President of the International Criminal Tribunal for the former Yugoslavia 
Sir Robert Yewdall Jennings, British judge appointed to the International Court of Justice
Kenneth Keith, New Zealand judge appointed to the International Court of Justice
Koen Lenaerts (LL.M. 78), Belgian judge at the European Court of Justice
Theodor Meron, United States jurist serving as President of the International Residual Mechanism for Criminal Tribunals, former President of the International Criminal Tribunal for the former Yugoslavia
Raul Pangalangan, Filipino lawyer appointed to the International Criminal Court
Navi Pillay, South African judge appointed to the International Criminal Court and the International Criminal Tribunal for Rwanda
Nawaf Salam, Lebanese judge appointed to the International Court of Justice
Sang-Hyun Song, South Korean lawyer who served as President and judge of the Appeals Chamber of the International Criminal Court

National court judges

United Kingdom
Mary Arden, Lady Arden of Heswall. Former Justice of the Supreme Court of the United Kingdom
Nicholas Hamblen, Lord Hamblen of Kersey. Current Justice of the Supreme Court of the United Kingdom

Hong Kong
Andrew Cheung Kui-nung (LLM 1985), Permanent Judge of the Court of Final Appeal of Hong Kong (2018– ); former Chief Judge of the High Court of Hong Kong and President of the Court of Appeal of Hong Kong (2011–2018)

India
Rohinton Fali Nariman (LLM), Judge, Supreme Court of India; former Solicitor General of India; youngest Senior Advocate designated by the Supreme Court of India in the history of Republic of India
Dhananjaya Y. Chandrachud, 50th Chief Justice of India

Other countries
Albert Francis Judd (LL.B. 1864, LL.D. 1894), Chief Justice, Kingdom of Hawaii Supreme Court
Bora Laskin (LL.M. 1939) Puisne Justice of the Supreme Court of Canada (1970–1973), Chief Justice of Canada (1973–1984)
Gertrude Lübbe-Wolff (LL.M.), Second Senate, Federal Constitutional Court of Germany
Sandile Ngcobo (LL.M.), Chief Justice of South Africa
Solomon Areda Waktolla (LL.M'14 and MPA'13), Deputy Chief Justice of the Federal Supreme Court of Ethiopia and member of the Court of the Permanent Court of Arbitration
Masaharu Ōhashi (LL.M. 1976), Justice of the Supreme Court of Japan
Ivan Rand  (LL.B. 1912) Puisne Justice of the Supreme Court of Canada (1943–1959)
Bernard Rix (LL.M. 1969), Lord Justice, English Court of Appeals
Wishart Spence (LL.M. 1929), Puisne Justice of the Supreme Court of Canada
Vicente Abad Santos (LL.M.), associate justice of the Supreme Court of the Philippines
Freda Steel (1978), Manitoba Court of Appeal judge
Lai In-jaw (S.J.D.), former President of the Judicial Yuan (Chief Justice of the Constitutional Court) of the Republic of China
Sundaresh Menon (LL.M. 1991), Chief Justice of Singapore
Andrew Phang (LL.M. 1984, S.J.D. 1987), Judge of Appeal, Supreme Court of Singapore
Renato Corona (LL.M.), former Chief Justice of the Supreme Court of the Philippines
Elijah Legwaila (LL.M. 1980), Judge of the Court of Appeal of Botswana
Gonçalo de Almeida Ribeiro (LL.M. 2007, S.J.D. 2012), Judge of the Constitutional Court of Portugal

International organizations figures
Radhika Coomaraswamy, Under-Secretary-General of the United Nations, Special Representative for Children and Armed Conflict
Gerald L. Neuman, United Nations Human Rights Committee
Navanethem Pillay (LLM 1982, SJD 1988), UN High Commissioner for Human Rights
Mary Robinson, former UN High Commissioner on Human Rights
Robert Zoellick, President of the World Bank Group
Eduardo Valencia Ospina, (LL.M. 1963) Chair of the UN International Law Commission, former Registrar of the International Court of Justice

Attorneys
Daniel J. Arbess (LL.M.), partner at White & Case
Michael F. Armstrong, attorney
Rayhan Asat (LL.M. 2016), attorney and human rights advocate
Joaquin Avila, voting rights advocate
Bennett Boskey (LL.B. 1939), law clerk to Judge Learned Hand and two U.S. Supreme Court justicesof 
Edmund N. Carpenter II (LL.B. 1948), former president Richards, Layton & Finger; past president of the Delaware State Bar Association and of the American Judicature Society
Morgan Chu (J.D. 1976), intellectual property lawyer and co-managing partner at Irell & Manella 
H. Rodgin Cohen, corporate lawyer noted for representation of large financial institutions during 2008 financial crisis
Susan Estrich, attorney; author; political commentator; first female president of Harvard Law Review; first female presidential campaign manager (Dukakis)
Bert Fields (LLB, 1952), entertainment lawyer, clients included The Beatles, James Cameron, Tom Cruise, and Michael Jackson
Joseph H. Flom, name partner at Skadden, Arps, Slate, Meagher & Flom
Haben Girma, disability rights advocate, first deafblind graduate of Harvard Law School
 Jill Collen Jefferson, human-rights lawyer at Julian legal
Khizr Khan, legal consultant
Christopher Landau, partner of Quinn Emanuel Urquhart & Sullivan
Francis Draper Lewis, co-founder of Morgan, Lewis & Bockius
John B. Quinn, founder and name partner of Quinn Emanuel Urquhart & Sullivan
Alex Spiro, former Assistant District Attorney for Manhattan; partner of Quinn Emanuel Urquhart & Sullivan
Kathleen Sullivan, former Dean of Stanford Law School; name partner of Quinn Emanuel Urquhart & Sullivan
Bethuel M. Webster, founder of Webster & Sheffield

Academia

University presidents
Jonathan R. Alger, James Madison University
Lawrence S. Bacow, Tufts University
Derek Bok, twice Harvard University
Kingman Brewster, Jr., Yale University and United States Ambassador to the United Kingdom
Thomas V. Chema, Hiram College
Colin Diver, Reed College
Thomas Ehrlich, Indiana University
Ken Gormley, Duquesne University
David Leebron, Rice University
William C. Powers, the University of Texas
Jennifer Raab, Hunter College, City University of New York
Father Michael Scanlan, Franciscan University of Steubenville
Joel Seligman, University of Rochester
John Sexton, New York University
Adel Tamano (LL.M.), University of the City of Manila of the Philippines and dean of Law of Liceo de Cagayan University
Michael K. Young, University of Washington

Legal academia

Law school deans

Andres D. Bautista (LL.M. 1993), law faculty dean at Far Eastern University in the Philippines
Mary Anne Bobinski, (LL.M. 1989), dean of the Allard School of Law at the University of British Columbia, 2003–2015
Tom Campbell (J.D. 1976), dean of the Chapman University School of Law
Erwin Chemerinsky (J.D. 1978), founding dean of University of California, Irvine School of Law; former constitutional law scholar at Duke Law School
Jim Chen, dean of University of Louisville School of Law
Robert C. Clark (J.D. 1972), dean (1989–2003) and professor at Harvard Law
Clarence Clyde Ferguson Jr. (LL.B. 1951), dean and professor at Harvard Law, diplomat and U.S. Ambassador to Uganda
Charles Hamilton Houston, dean of Howard University School of Law and NAACP litigation director
Peter Hogg, (LL.M. 1963), dean of Osgoode Hall Law School of Toronto, constitutional scholar
Bruce Jacob (S.J.D.), alumnus, professor, and dean of Stetson University College of Law, dean of Mercer University Law School
Kevin Johnson, dean of the UC Davis School of Law (King Hall)
Elena Kagan (J.D. 1986), dean of Harvard Law (2003–2009)
Joseph D. Kearney (J.D. 1989), dean of the Marquette University Law School
 Edwin R. Keedy (LL.B. 1906), Dean of the University of Pennsylvania Law School
W. Page Keeton, dean of the University of Texas School of Law
Harold Hongju Koh (J.D. 1980), dean of Yale Law School and Assistant Secretary of State
Tommy Koh (LL.M. 1964), former dean of National University of Singapore Faculty of Law, Ambassador-at-Large for the Government of Singapore
Charles T. McCormick, dean of the University of Texas Law School and the University of North Carolina School of Law
Robert Mundheim (LLB 1957), dean of the University of Pennsylvania Law School
Makau W. Mutua (LL.M. 1985, S.J.D. 1987), dean of the University at Buffalo Law School, The State University of New York
William L. Prosser, dean of the Boalt Hall School of Law at UC Berkeley
Symeon C. Symeonides (LL.M. 1974, S.J.D. 1980), dean of the Willamette University College of Law
Cesar L. Villanueva (LL.M. 1989), dean of the Ateneo de Manila Law School in the Philippines
Goh Yihan (LL.M. 2010), dean of the SMU School of Law at the Singapore Management University

Conflict of Laws
Joseph Henry Beale, professor of conflict of laws, corporations, and criminal law at Harvard Law School (acting dean, 1929-1930) and University of Chicago Law School (1st dean, 1902-1904)

Constitutional law
Jack Balkin, studies constitutional law and the impact of technology on law
Robert Delahunty (J.D. 1983), professor of constitutional law at the University of St. Thomas School of Law
Michael C. Dorf, professor of constitutional law at Columbia Law School
Patrick J. Monahan, senior policy analyst to Ontario AG Ian Scott during Canadian Meech Lake Accord
John Ordronaux, Civil War army surgeon, professor of medical jurisprudence at Columbia Law School, pioneering mental health commissioner
Richard Pildes, professor of constitutional law and public law at NYU School of Law
Nadine Strossen, professor of constitutional law and scholar of civil liberties at New York Law School, former president of the ACLU
Kathleen Sullivan, constitutional law scholar at Stanford Law School
Arthur E. Sutherland, Jr. (J.D. 1925), professor of constitutional and commercial law at Harvard Law School; clerked with Justice Oliver Wendell Holmes, Jr.; took two cases before the US Supreme Court, one on price fixing in New York, and one on the Massachusetts Blue Laws; author and editor of numerous law texts
Laurence Tribe (J.D. 1966), professor of constitutional law at Harvard Law School
Paul C. Weiler, Henry J. Friendly Professor of Law, Emeritus, Harvard Law School; influenced the Canadian 1982 Constitution

Criminal law
Robert Blecker, criminal law professor at New York Law School and national expert on and advocate for the death penalty
Bernard Harcourt (J.D. 1989), criminological critical theorist
Dan Markel, law professor at Florida State University College of Law specializing in penology
Stephen Schulhofer (born 1942), Professor of Law at the University of Pennsylvania Law School and NYU Law School

Legal history
Richard B. Bernstein (J.D. 1980), constitutional historian at New York Law School
Richard H. Helmholz (LL.B. 1965), property, natural resource, and legal history scholar at the University of Chicago Law School
Bernard Hibbitts (LL.M. 1988), legal history and technology of law scholar at the University of Pittsburgh School of Law
Morton Horwitz (LL.B. 1967), torts and legal history scholar
John H. Langbein (LL.B. 1968), Sterling Professor of Law and Legal History at Yale Law School
Daniel H. Lowenstein (LLB 1967), election law at UCLA Law School
Charles Warren, Pulitzer Prize–winning legal historian and Assistant Attorney General

International law
Payam Akhavan (LL.M. 1990, S.J.D. 2001), UN Special Rapporteur, Visiting Fellow at Oxford University, Member of Permanent Court of Arbitration at the Hague 
 Francis Boyle, international law professor at the University of Illinois
Amy Chua (J.D. 1987), international law and economics scholar at Yale Law School
Louis Henkin (LL.B 1940), international law and human rights authority
David Kennedy, critical theorist of international law
Joe Oloka-Onyango (LL.M., S.J.D.), Ugandan legal academic at Makerere University
Eric Posner, international law scholar at the University of Chicago Law School
Brad R. Roth, professor of international law and political science at Wayne State University
Simon Tay, associate professor at the National University of Singapore Faculty of Law

Law and literature
Jane C. Ginsburg, art and literary law property professor at Columbia Law
Dan Fenno Henderson (1949), founder of the University of Washington Asian law program; author of several works related to Japanese law
James Boyd White (1964), founder of the Law and Literature movement

Legal philosophy
Randy Barnett, libertarian legal theorist
Ronald Dworkin, legal and political philosopher
Richard Posner (LL.B. 1962), professor at the University of Chicago Law School, started the law and economics movement, judge on the United States Court of Appeals for the Seventh Circuit
Peter Tillers, professor at Cardozo Law School and theorist of the law of evidence

Law and technology
Jack Balkin, studies constitutional law and the impact of technology on law
William W. Fisher, intellectual property law professor at Harvard Law School and director of the Berkman Center for Internet and Society
Peter Junger (LL.B. 1958), Internet law activist and professor at Case Western Reserve University
Charles Nesson, professor at Harvard Law School and founder of the Berkman Center for Internet & Society
Michael Rustad, intellectual property scholar, author, and professor at Suffolk University Law School
Tim Wu (J.D. 1998), professor of law and technology at Columbia; coined the term "net neutrality"; writer for Slate
Jonathan Zittrain (J.D. 1995), professor of Internet Law at Harvard Law School and Harvard Kennedy School

Other legal academia
Alberto Alemanno, legal scholar at New York University 
Stephen Barnett (1935–2009), legal scholar at Berkeley Law who opposed the Newspaper Preservation Act of 1970
George Bisharat, expert on Middle East legal and political affairs
Andrew Burrows (LL.M. 1981), Professor of the Law of England at the University of Oxford and senior research fellow at All Souls College
Hugh Collins (LL.M. 1976), Vinerian Professor of English Law at the University of Oxford and fellow of All Souls College
 Kimberlé Crenshaw, professor at Columbia Law School and UCLA Law School and Centennial Professor at the London School of Economics; critical race scholar, civil rights advocate, introduced and developed intersectional theory
Susan Estrich, feminist and legal commentator for Fox News
Owen M. Fiss, Sterling Professor at Yale Law School
Robert P. George, professor of jurisprudence at Princeton University
Martin D. Ginsburg (J.D. 1958), taxation law expert, professor of law at Georgetown University Law Center
Annette Gordon-Reed (J.D. 1984), professor at Harvard Law School and Pulitzer Prize for History winner 
Robert A. Gorman (LL.B. 1962), law professor at the University of Pennsylvania Law School
John Chipman Gray (LL.B. 1861), property law professor and founder of the law firm Ropes & Gray
Livingston Hall, Roscoe Pound Professor of Law at Harvard Law School until his 1971 retirement
George Haskins (1942), Algernon Sydney Biddle Professor of Law at the University of Pennsylvania Law School
John Honnold (1939), William A. Schnader Professor of Commercial Law at the University of Pennsylvania Law School
 William A. Jacobson, Cornell Law School professor and blogger
Christine M. Jolls, professor of law and economics at Yale Law School
Jerry Kang, Professor at the UCLA School of Law and UCLA's first vice chancellor for equality, diversity and inclusion
Thio Li-ann (LL.M. 1993), professor at the National University of Singapore Faculty of Law
Lance Liebman, professor at Columbia Law School and director of the American Law Institute
John F. Manning, Bruce Bromley Professor at Harvard Law School
Mari Matsuda, professor at Georgetown University Law Center, a leading voice in critical race theory, and first tenured female Asian American law professor in the U.S.
Arthur R. Miller, professor at NYU School of Law, former professor at Harvard Law School
Paul Steven Miller, disability rights expert, EEOC Commissioner, professor at the University of Washington School of Law, Special Assistant to the President
Charles ("Chuck") W. Mooney Jr., the Charles A. Heimbold, Jr. Professor of Law, and former interim Dean, at the University of Pennsylvania Law School
Herbert B. Newberg, class action attorney
John V. Orth (J.D. 1974), professor of law at UNC-Chapel Hill
John Palfrey, Executive Director of the Berkman Center for Internet and Society and Harvard clinical professor of law
 Lawrence Solan (J.D. 1982), professor of law at Brooklyn Law School
Reed Shuldiner (J.D. 1983), Alvin L. Snowiss Professor of Law at the University of Pennsylvania Law School
Cass Sunstein (J.D. 1978), professor at Harvard Law School
 Amy Wax (first year of law school, 1981), Robert Mundheim Professor of Law at the University of Pennsylvania Law School
Patricia J. Williams (J.D. 1975), proponent of critical race theory in law

Other academia
Edward N. Beiser (1977), political scientist
Wallace Clift (J.D. 1952), psychology and religion, author of books including Jung and Christianity: The Challenge of Reconciliationde
Herbert J. Davenport, economist
John Fiske, philosopher and historian
Harvey J. Levin (Fellow in Law and Economics, 1963–64), communications economist
John Matteson, English professor and Pulitzer Prize–winning literary biographer
Cheryl Mendelson, ethics philosopher and novelist
Samuel Moyn (J.D. 2001), intellectual historian
Eli Noam (J.D. 1975), professor of finance and economics at Columbia Business School
David Riesman, sociologist; author of The Lonely Crowd
Anne-Marie Slaughter, dean of the Woodrow Wilson School of Public and International Affairs at Princeton University
Robert Somol, director of the University of Illinois at Chicago architecture school

Activism
George Thorndike Angell, anti-animal cruelty activist
Richard Barnet (J.D. 1954), disarmament activist and co-founder of the leftist think tank Institute for Policy Studies
Larissa Behrendt (LL.M. 1994), Australian aboriginal rights activist, novelist
Janet Benshoof, human rights lawyer, founder of the Center for Reproductive Rights and the Global Justice Center
Luke Cole, environmental lawyer and co-founder of the Center on Race, Poverty & the Environment
John P. Davis (LL.B. 1933), African American activist
Alfred-Maurice de Zayas, human rights advocate and historian
George Esser, civil rights advocate
Sandra Froman, president of the National Rifle Association
Jennifer Gordon, immigrant labor organizer
Jodi Grant, executive director of the Afterschool Alliance
Mark J. Green, public interest author, candidate for Senator from New York (1986), Mayor of New York City (2001) and New York State Attorney General (2006)
Archibald Grimké, co-founder of the NAACP
Marjorie Heins, free speech and civil liberties advocate
Mary Howell (J.D. 1991), fought to open medical schools to women
Muhammad Kenyatta, civil rights leader and professor
Irene Khan, Secretary General of Amnesty International
Brink Lindsey, Cato Institute libertarian activist
Hans F. Loeser (J.D. 1950), anti-Vietnam War activist
David A. Morse, winner of the Nobel Peace Prize for leadership of the International Labour Organization
Ethan Nadelmann, anti-War on Drugs activist
Ralph Nader, consumer advocate and frequent Green Party presidential candidate
Basil O'Connor, polio research advocate and president of the American Red Cross
Rebecca Onie, CEO of Health Leads and MacArthur Fellowship recipient
Wendell Phillips (1934), abolitionist and Native American rights advocate
Louis L. Redding (LL.B. 1928), NAACP lawyer and civil rights advocate; first African American admitted to the Delaware bar
Randall Robinson, anti-apartheid and pro-Haitian immigrant activist; founded the TransAfrica Forum
Harvey A. Silverglate, founder of the Foundation for Individual Rights in Education
Silda Wall Spitzer, founder of Children for Children, former First Lady of New York State
Bryan Stevenson, founder and executive director of the Equal Justice Initiative, and author of Just Mercy
Moorfield Storey, president of the NAACP and the Anti-Imperialist League
Nadine Strossen, president of the American Civil Liberties Union
William English Walling, co-founder of the NAACP and founder of the Women's Trade Union League
Evan Wolfson, civil rights attorney, founder and president of Freedom to Marry
Harry Rothenberg, civil rights/injury  attorney, son of Allen Rothenberg head of COLPA

Arts

Acting
Justin Deabler, starred in The Real World: Hawaii (1992)
Jared Delgin, child actor
David Dorfman, film and television actor, child prodigy
Hill Harper, film, television, and stage actor
Samuel S. Hinds, starred in It's a Wonderful Life and Abbott & Costello films
Sheila Kuehl, child actress, first openly gay member of the California legislature

Architecture
Paul Byard, architect and director of the Columbia architecture school historic preservation program

Comedy
Richard Appel, comic writer, The Simpsons and The Cleveland Show
John Cochran, comedy writer and television personality
Fred de Cordova, producer of The Tonight Show Starring Johnny Carson
Greg Giraldo, stand-up comedian and television personality

Film
Sidney Salkow, director

Literature
Benjamin Vaughan Abbott (LL.B. 1851), novelist and author of the New York State penal code
Seth Abramson (J.D. 2001), poet
Jacob M. Appel, short story writer, playwright (Arborophilia, The Mistress of Wholesome, Creve Coeur)
John Ballem (LL.M. 1950), murder mystery/thriller novelist
Louis Begley (LL.B. 1959), PEN/Hemingway Award-winning novelist; author of About Schmidt
Alexander Boldizar (J.D. 1999), writer and critic
Susan Cain (J.D. 1993), attorney, New York Times bestselling writer (Quiet: The Power of Introverts... and Bittersweet)
Viola Canales (J.D. 1989), novelist and short story writer
John Casey, novelist
Max Ehrmann, poet
Amy Gutman (J.D. 1993), novelist
Mohsin Hamid (J.D. 1997), novelist; author of the PEN/Hemingway Award finalist Moth Smoke and the Booker Prize-nominated The Reluctant Fundamentalist
Murad Kalam (J.D. 2002), novelist and short story writer
Brad Leithauser, poet, novelist, essay
James Russell Lowell, romantic poet, satirist, literary critic, United States Ambassador to Spain, and United States Ambassador to the United Kingdom
Archibald MacLeish (LL.B. 1919), Pulitzer Prize–winning modernist poet, playwright and Librarian of Congress
John Matteson (J.D. 1986), Pulitzer Prize–winning biographer
James Alan McPherson, Pulitzer Prize–winning short story writer and essayist
Cheryl Mendelson, novelist and philosopher of medical ethics
John Jay Osborn, Jr., author of The Paper Chase
Wena Poon (J.D. 1998), Singaporean author
Susan Power, PEN/Hemingway Award-winning novelist
William Henry Rhodes (LL.B. 1846), poet, essayist, short story writer
Akhil Sharma, PEN/Hemingway Award-winning short story writer, novelist
Pamela Thomas-Graham, author of the Ivy League Mysteries series
Arthur Train (LL.B. 1899), author of legal thrillers
Scott Turow (J.D. 1978), author of legal thrillers
Walter Wager, mystery and spy fiction novelist
Ayelet Waldman (J.D. 1991), novelist; wrote Mommy-Track Mysteries, Love and Other Impossible Pursuits; former columnist for Slate
Sabin Willett (J.D. 1983), novelist and defense lawyer for Guantanamo Bay detainment camp inmates
Lauren Willig, historical romance novelist
William Winter (LL.B. 1857), author and literary critic
Owen Wister (LL.B. 1888), writer of westerns, including The Virginian
Austin Tappan Wright (L.L.B. 1908), writer and legal scholar, wrote Islandia

Music
 Samim Bilgen (1962), Turkish composer
 Ruben Blades, salsa singer-songwriter and Panamanian Minister of Tourism
 Jackie Fuchs (J.D., 1991), bassist for the music group The Runaways under her former stage name of Jackie Fox
 Bridgit Mendler, singer and actress
 James Cutler Dunn Parker, composer

Visual arts
George Hitchcock, painter
William Wetmore Story, sculptor

Business
John Jacob Astor III, financier and member of the Astor family
Lloyd Blankfein, chairman and CEO of Goldman Sachs
David Bonderman, co-founder of private equity firm TPG Capital
Doug Carlston, founder of computer game company Brøderbund Software
Finn M. W. Caspersen (J.D. 1966), financier, philanthropist, CEO of Beneficial Corporation and Knickerbocker Management
Kenneth Chenault, chairman and CEO of American Express
Domenico De Sole, chairman of Tom Ford International and Sotheby's
Russ DeLeon, founder of online gambling site PartyGaming
Marc Dreier, sole equity partner in Dreier LLP convicted of securities fraud for selling $700 million in fictitious promissory notes
James Martin Eder
Jonathan Greenleaf Eveleth, founder of first U.S. oil company
Roger W. Ferguson, Jr. (J.D. 1979), CEO of TIAA-CREF
Kenneth Frazier (J.D. 1978), President and CEO of Merck & Co.
Tully Friedman, founder of Friedman Fleischer & Lowe and Chairman of the Board of Trustees of the American Enterprise Institute
Gerald Grinstein, CEO of Delta Air Lines
Douglas Hagerman, General Counsel, Secretary, and Senior Vice President of Rockwell Automation
Charles E. Haldeman, CEO of Freddie Mac 
Glenn Hutchins, co-founder of private equity firm Silver Lake Partners
Mitchell R. Julis, co-founder of hedge fund Canyon Capital Advisors
Jeff Kindler, CEO of Pfizer
Reginald Lewis, first African American financier to create a billion-dollar business
Kenneth Lipper, investment banker, novelist, film producer
Alfred Lee Loomis
 Mathew Martoma (born 1974 as Ajai Mathew Mariamdani Thomas), hedge fund portfolio manager, convicted of insider trading
Charlie Munger, Vice-Chairman of Berkshire Hathaway
 L. L. Nunn, entrepreneur and educator
Adebayo Ogunlesi, Chairman of private equity firm Global Infrastructure Partners
Ellen Pao, interim CEO of Reddit
Abram Nicholas Pritzker, founder of the Hyatt hotel chain
Keith Rabois, technology entrepreneur, executive and investor
Clarence B. Randall, Chairman of the Inland Steel Company
Sumner Redstone, Chairman of National Amusements
Leonid Rozhetskin, financier
Anthony Scaramucci, founder and co-managing partner of SkyBridge Capital
Paul Singer, founder and CEO of Elliott Management Corporation and founder of the Paul E. Singer Family Foundation
Jeff Smisek, Chairman, President, and CEO of United Airlines
Gerald L. Storch, Chairman and CEO of Toys "R" Us
Pamela Thomas-Graham, CEO of CNBC
Charlemagne Tower, railroad executive
Jon Vander Ark, president of Republic Services
Bruce Wasserstein, CEO of Lazard
William Woodward, Sr., banker and thoroughbred horse racer
Mortimer Zuckerman, editor-in-chief of U.S. News & World Report, owner of the New York Daily News

Entertainment industry
Paul Attanasio, TV/film screenwriter and producer; worked on House and Homicide: Life on the Street
Ron Bass, Academy Award-winning screenwriter and film producer; wrote Rain Man
Peter Blake, consulting producer for House
Debra Martin Chase, Hollywood producer
Clive Davis, Grammy Award-winning music producer
Frederick de Cordova (1933), film and television director and producer
Bill Jemas, comic book writer and producer
Christopher Keyser, TV screenwriter for Party of Five
Jeff Kwatinetz, music manager and television producer
Ken Ludwig, playwright and theater director
Jeffrey Orridge, television executive
David Otunga, actor; former reality tv contestant; WWE wrestler and commentator; two-time WWE Tag Team Champion; lawyer; former husband of Jennifer Hudson
Cary Sherman, Chairman and CEO of the Recording Industry Association of America
David Sonenberg, music manager and film producer
Jon F. Vein, founder and CEO of MarketShare (subsidiary of Neustar); Emmy Award-winning animation producer
David Zippel, Tony Award-winning musical theater lyricist

Media and journalism

Commentators
Keith Boykin, author, commentator; hosts My Two Cents on BET
Jim Cramer, host of CNBC's Mad Money and co-founder of TheStreet.com
Debra Dickerson, essayist on race
Rebecca Eisenberg (J.D. 1993), early blogger and writer on technology
Susan Estrich, feminist and legal commentator for Fox News
David Frum, author and speechwriter for President George W. Bush
Thomas Geoghegan, legal commentator
Lawrence Otis Graham, writer on contemporary race and class issues
Norman Hapgood, editor and critic
George Stillman Hillard, biographer, journalist, and Maine state politician
John H. Hinderaker, conservative blogger
 Elie Honig (J.D., 2000) assistant United States Attorney and CNN senior legal analyst
Mickey Kaus, journalist and blogger for Slate
Carol Platt Liebau (1992), political analyst and commentator
Eric Liu, writer on race and mentorship; columnist for Slate
Ruth Marcus (J.D. 1984), columnist for The Washington Post
Kevin Philips, political commentator, Richard Nixon campaign strategist
Samantha Power, Pulitzer Prize–winning writer on genocide, human rights, and foreign policy
Laurie Puhn, commentator, self-help author, and television hostess
Dong Puno, Philippine columnist, television host and producer
Ben Shapiro, conservative commentator for The Daily Wire
Jeffrey Steingarten, columnist for Vogue and Slate magazines; food critic
James B. Stewart, Pulitzer Prize–winning journalist
Jeffrey Toobin, legal analyst for CNN and staff writer for The New Yorker
Lis Wiehl (1987), legal analyst for Fox News and NPR
Tim Wu, writer for Slate; coined the term "net neutrality";  professor of law and technology at Columbia

Journalists
Benjamin C. Bradlee, former editor-at-large of The Washington Post
Adam Cohen, editorial page editor for The New York Times
Lisa Daniels (1997), anchorwoman for NBC's Weekend Today
William L. Laurence, Pulitzer Prize–winning science journalist who covered the testing and dropping of the atomic bomb
Rob Simmelkjaer, anchor/correspondent for ABC News Now
Gregory White Smith, 1991 Pulitzer Prize–winning author of Jackson Pollock: An American Saga
James B. Stewart, 1988 Pulitzer Prize winner for explanatory journalism

Publishers
Robert C. Bassett, publisher of the Milwaukee Sentinel
 Martin S. Fox (1924–2020), publisher 
Phil Graham, publisher of The Washington Post
Tim Hays, publisher of the Riverside Press-Enterprise
Boisfeuillet Jones, Jr., publisher and CEO of The Washington Post
Cliff Sloan, publisher of Slate magazine

Military
John F. Aiso, highest-ranking Japanese American Army Officer in WW2, Legion of Merit honoree, later judge
Charles J. Biddle, flying ace during the First World War, attorney and author 
Raynal Bolling, first high ranking American officer killed in the First World War
David M. Brahms, brigadier general in the United States Marine Corps
Benjamin B. Ferencz, chief prosecutor for the U.S. Army at the Einsatzgruppen trial
Manning Force (1848), Union leader in the American Civil War
Hildreth Frost, Judge Advocate in Colorado National Guard during the Colorado Coalfield War
George Henry Gordon, Union general during the American Civil War; military historian
Albert G. Jenkins (1850), Confederate brigadier general during the American Civil War and Congressman from Virginia (1857–61)
Mark S. Martins (1990), Brigadier General (United States Army) and Chief Prosecutor of Military Commissions
Samuel Underhill, naval aviator
Ken Watkin,  Brigadier General and Judge Advocate General of the Canadian Forces
Charles White Whittlesey, led the Lost Battalion in the Argonne Forest during the First World War

Spies
Helge Boes, CIA agent
John T. Downey, CIA agent captured in China
Alger Hiss, alleged spy of the Soviet Union

Sports
Sandy Alderson (J.D., 1976), senior advisor of the Oakland Athletics
Bob Arum, boxing promoter
Mike Brown, owner of the Cincinnati Bengals 
Sashi Brown, president of the Baltimore Ravens 
Brian Burke, president of hockey operations for the Calgary Flames
Dick Button, figure skater and figure skating commentator
Steve Clark, freestyle swimmer, multiple Olympic gold medallist and former world record holder
Don Cohan, Olympic bronze medalist in sailing
Lou DiBella, boxing promoter
Len Elmore, professional basketball player, sportscaster
Lawrence Fleisher, sports agent; helped found the NBA Players Association
Russ Granik, deputy commissioner of the NBA
Eddie Grant, Major League Baseball player (1905–1915), nicknamed "Harvard Eddie"
Rick Hahn (J.D., 1996), general manager of the Chicago White Sox
Rick Horrow, sports business expert
Ralph Horween, Harvard Crimson and NFL football player
Hayes Jenkins, figure skater
Rob Manfred, commissioner of Major League Baseball
Jeffrey Orridge, commissioner of the Canadian Football League
Tony Petitti, president and CEO of the MLB Network
Michael Weiner (J.D. 1986), executive director of the Major League Baseball Players Association

Other
Myron Avery, Appalachian Trail hiker and travel guide author
Andy Bloch, champion poker player
Ken Fisher (J.D. 1987), pen name Ruben Bolling, cartoonist, author of Tom the Dancing Bug
Richard Henry Dana, Jr. (1837), writer on sea life and expert on maritime law
William Austin Dickinson, older brother of poet Emily Dickinson
Amanda Goad, winner of the Scripps National Spelling Bee and Jeopardy! Teen Tournament
Charles Goldfarb, co-inventor of the markup language concept
Erika Harold, winner of the Miss America contest
Gardiner Greene Hubbard, founder and first president of the National Geographic Society
Arnold W. G. Kean, developed civil aviation law
Joel I. Klein, New York City School Chancellor
Richard Lederer, author of books on language and wordplay
Robert Malley, analyst of the Israeli–Palestinian conflict
Scotty McLennan, author and Dean of Religious Life at Stanford University
George S. Morison (1866), bridge designer
Cara Mund, Miss America 2018
Michelle Obama, First Lady of the United States
George Padmore, Pan-Africanist figure
Francis Parkman, freelance historian and horticulturalist
Joan Whitney Payson, philanthropist and patron of the arts
Professor Michael Rustad, noted law school professor and prolific author
Walter H. Seward (LL.B. 1924), third oldest living American and seventh-oldest living human
David Spindler, independent scholar of the Great Wall of China
William Stringfellow, lay theologian
Sonam Dechen Wangchuck (LL.M. 2007), Princess of Bhutan
Mary Allen Wilkes, LINC computer designer and first home computer user

Non-graduates
These students attended Harvard Law but, for various reasons, did not graduate.

Brooks Adams, historian
Larz Anderson, diplomat and businessman, U.S. Ambassador to Japan (1912–13)
William Christian Bullitt, Jr. (dropped out 1914), U.S. Ambassador to the Soviet Union (1933–1969)
William Bundy, CIA figure who had a role in planning the Vietnam War
Allan B. Calhamer, developed the board game Diplomacy
Daniel Henry Chamberlain (dropped out 1863), Governor of South Carolina
Frank Church (transferred), U.S. Senator from Idaho (1957–81)
John Sherman Cooper (dropped out), U.S. Senator from Kentucky (1946–1949, 1952–1955, 1956–1973)
Danny Fields (dropped out 1959), figure in the underground New York punk rock scene
Melville Fuller (dropped out 1855), Chief Justice of the U.S. Supreme Court
Ruth Bader Ginsburg (transferred), U.S. Supreme Court Justice (1993–2020)
Arthur A. Hartman (dropped out 1948), U.S. Ambassador to France (1977–1981), United States Ambassador to the Soviet Union (1981–1987)
Henry James, novelist; author of The Bostonians and Washington Square
Jodi Kantor (dropped out), reporter and editor on culture and politics for The New York Times
Philip Kaufman, film screenwriter and director
Joseph P. Kennedy Jr., left before his last year to serve in WWII, where he was killed
Michael Kinsley (transferred), journalist, editor, and host of Crossfire
Nicholas Longworth (transferred), Speaker of the House (1925–31)
Greg Mankiw (dropped out 1984), economist
Pat McCormick, comic actor and writer
Gordon McLendon, created Top 40 radio format
Louis Menand (dropped out 1974), American cultural and intellectual historian
William Henry Moody (dropped out), U.S. Supreme Court Justice (1906–1910), U.S. Attorney General (1904–1906), U.S. Secretary of the Navy (1902–1904), Congressman from Massachusetts (1895–1902)
George Murdock, anthropologist
John Negroponte (dropped out 1960), U.S. Deputy Secretary of State, Director of National Intelligence
Cole Porter, composer and songwriter
Roscoe Pound (dropped out 1890), dean of Harvard Law School
Donald Regan, U.S. Secretary of the Treasury (1981–1985), White House Chief of Staff (1985–1987)
Angelo Rizzuto, photographer
Robert Rubin (dropped out), Secretary of the Treasury
William James Sidis (dropped out 1919), famous child prodigy
Alfred D. Sieminski (dropped out 1936), Congressman from New Jersey (1951–1959)
Adlai Stevenson II (dropped out), Governor of Illinois (1949–1953) and Democratic presidential candidate (1952, 1956)
Joe Vila (dropped out), sports writer
Robert W. Welch Jr. (dropped out), founder of the anticommunist John Birch Society

Fictitious alumni
Philip Banks, character on the TV series Fresh Prince of Bel-Air
Rafael Barba, Manhattan ADA on Law and Order: SVU
Oliver Barrett, main character in the film Love Story and its sequel Oliver's Story
Cable, superhero from the X-Force and X-Men comic books, as disclosed in X-Force Vol. 1 No. 40
Lindsay Dole, character on the TV series The Practice
Jerry Espenson, character on the TV series Boston Legal
Artemus Gordon, character in the film Wild Wild West
Ainsley Hayes, character on the TV Series The West Wing
Miranda Hobbes, character on the TV series Sex and the City
Thurston Howell, III, character on the TV series Gilligan's Island
Annalise Keating, main character on the TV series How to Get Away With Murder
Louis Litt, character on the TV series Suits
Ally McBeal, main character in the eponymous TV series
Mitch McDeere, main character in the TV series The Firm and the John Grisham novel which it was adapted from
Harvey Specter,  character on the TV series Suits
Elle Woods, main character in the Legally Blonde films and musical
Jamie Reagan, main character on Blue Bloods (TV series)
Frank Underwood, fictional Majority Whip of US House of Representatives, Vice President of the United States and President of the United States,main character on the TV series House of Cards

References

Law School alumni
Lists of people by university or college in Massachusetts